The Salem Downtown Historic District is located in Salem, Ohio. The district covers approximately  bounded by Vine, Ohio, East Pershing, and South Ellsworth Streets, as well as Sugar Tree Alley. The district was added to the National Register of Historic Places in December 1995.

References

National Register of Historic Places in Columbiana County, Ohio
Greek Revival architecture in Ohio
Italianate architecture in Ohio
Queen Anne architecture in Ohio
Historic districts in Columbiana County, Ohio
Historic districts on the National Register of Historic Places in Ohio